List of Academic All-America Team Members of the Year is a list of the annual selection by College Sports Communicators (CSC; known before the 2022–23 school year as the College Sports Information Directors of America, or CoSIDA) and its Academic All-America sponsor of the individual athlete selected as the most outstanding of the approximately 1640 annual Academic All-America selections. Since the 2019 awards, one winner has been chosen for each of five divisions. Three of the divisions correspond directly to the three divisions of the National Collegiate Athletic Association (NCAA)—Division I, Division II, and Division III. A fourth division, introduced with the 2019 award cycle, is for National Association of Intercollegiate Athletics (NAIA) members. The last of the five is the College Division, which currently includes U.S. four-year institutions that are not NCAA or NAIA members, Canadian universities and colleges, and two-year colleges. The College Division was introduced in 1996, covering not only those institutions in today's College Division but also NCAA institutions outside Division I and NAIA members. After the 2011 award cycle, NCAA Divisions II and III were spun off from the College Division and given their own Academic All-America teams. NCAA Division I has had its own Academic All-America team since 1996—originally as the University Division, and since 2012 under its own name. Between 1988 and 1995, only one winner was chosen per year across all institutions participating in the program.  The Academic All-America program recognizes combined athletic and academic excellence of the nation's top student-athletes.

Currently, each team selects Academic All-District honorees in eight geographic districts across the United States and Canada.  First team All-District honorees make the All-America team ballots. Currently, all twelve Academic All-American teams (Men's and women's basketball, men's and women's soccer, men's and women's track & field, men's baseball, women's softball, men's American football, women's volleyball and men's and women's at-large teams) has one Academic All-American of the Year for every division.  One of these twelve sport-by-sport Academic All-American of the years is selected as the Academic All-America Team Members of the Year for each division.

Three individuals have been named winners twice—Sarah Pavan of Nebraska in 2007 and 2008 for what was then called the University Division, and Maryanne Gong of MIT and Leah Esposito of Carroll College in Montana in 2016 and 2017, respectively in Division III and the College Division.

Division I (formerly University Division) 
Note: All athletes are American unless otherwise indicated.

Division II

Division III

NAIA

College Division
Included NCAA schools outside Division I from 1996–2011, and NAIA members from 1996–2018.

See also
Walter Byers Scholarship

Notes

External links
Academic All-America information page

College sports trophies and awards in the United States
Academic